Torre Catalano is an American film producer, director and writer better known for his documentary film Mayor of Strawberry Fields and the music video Yes We Can. He also produced and directed a short film for Katy Perry.

Catalano founded the production company The Colors You Like with Grammy-Nominated Producer Billy Mann.

Filmography

References

External links 
 

American film producers
American male screenwriters
American film directors
Living people
Year of birth missing (living people)